Parker-Hale Ltd. was a British firearms, air rifle and firearms accessory manufacturer, located in the Gun Quarter of the city of Birmingham, England. It was founded by Alfred Gray Parker and Arthur Hale.

History
Alfred Gray Parker founded a rifle manufacturing company in 1890. In 1910, he invited his nephew, Alfred Thomas Corbyn Hale, to become a partner in the limited liability company, with the shares being taken up by members of both the Parker and Hale families. A first catalogue was issued of arms and shooting accessories and, though limited in its range, clearly showed the company's growing trend for the development of accessories.

By 1914 the company's small manufacturing plant was well established and the Ministry of Munitions ordered training equipment from Parker-Hale. The "Parkerifling" process, coupled with the Hiscock-Parker magazine, enabled service rifles to be converted to .22 Long Rifle (.22 LR) for use as training rifles, and demand was such that the Parker-Hale factory was soon working to full capacity.

In 1924, Hale's son, Arthur, joined the business, and in 1926 a family record was set up when Hale and his two eldest sons took part in the "King's Prize" at Bisley. This event was eclipsed two years later when Arthur Hale succeeded in winning the coveted prize itself. He was appointed Director of the Company in 1928.

With the outbreak of the Second World War, the available resources of the gun trade had been mobilised to recondition a reserve of Pattern 1914 Enfield rifles, and in 1940 the Parker-Hale Arms Company was founded. Additional premises were acquired "for the duration" of the war and, under the management of Arthur Hale, a large reconditioning programme was rapidly carried through. A wide range of additional war contract work followed, principally with the manufacture of .30-06 Springfield and .303 British drill cartridges in large quantities.

After the close of hostilities, with a fall in production contracts and no permanent premises, the company had little choice but to invest in a small factory unit, erected under the Government's emergency programme to re-house bombed-out manufacturers. Meanwhile, the Parker-Hale Arms Company was transferred to the Birmingham Proof House, where it continued with the reconditioning of .22 LR weapons for junior training organisations. The company ceased to exist upon completion of the contracts.

The immediate post-war years can best be described as a period of frustrated opportunity, since overseas markets were opened but materials of all sorts were in short supply. Nevertheless, by 1948 business abroad far exceeded the home trade.

Positioned alongside the BSA factory sportsground and Sparkbrook, from which the local area gets its name, the Parker-Hale factory headquarter building echoes the traditions of the Birmingham gunmaking industry, since it occupies the very site that the Proof House located their testing range.

Business at Parker-Hale remained relatively stable throughout the 1960s and into the 1980s, with sales of target and sporting rifles, handguns, shotguns and ammunition sitting comfortably alongside the company's comprehensive range of rifle scopes, knives, gun care accessories and cleaning kits.

The company received a temporary setback in 1985 when the Chairman and Managing Director, John le Breton, who had been instrumental in consolidating the company's success in world markets, retired from the board. The founder's grandson, Roger Hale, then took over as Managing Director, and proved an influential figure in successfully re-positioning the company in what was to prove a constantly changing industry.

Lacking the investment necessary to enable the company to compete effectively in newly emerging markets, Parker-Hale was eventually sold to the Midlands engineering group, Modular Industries Ltd. In 1992 it was purchased by Navy Arms and spun off as Gibbs Rifle Company, Inc.

Partial list of Parker-Hale firearms 

Submachine guns:
 Parker-Hale PDW

Shotguns:
 Parker-Hale Rogun
 Parker-Hale 600 series
 Parker-Hale 700 series
 Parker-Hale 800 series

Rifles:

References

External links
 Original Parker-Hale Company website (archived)
 John Rothery Wholesale Company website
 Parker-Hale-Germany
 Sporting Rifles based on Lee–Enfields

Defunct companies based in Birmingham, West Midlands
Manufacturing companies based in Birmingham, West Midlands
Firearm manufacturers of the United Kingdom
Defunct firearms manufacturers
Defunct manufacturing companies of England